Charles Adair may refer to:

Charles Henry Adair (1851–1920), British admiral
Charles L. Adair (1902–1993), American rear admiral
Charles Wallace Adair (1914–2006), US Ambassador
Charles Adair (soccer) (born 1971), retired American soccer player
Sir Charles Adair (Royal Marines officer) (1822–1897), Royal Marines general

See also
Adair (name)